Gregorio Céspedes (or Gregorio de Céspedes), SJ (1551–1611) was a Spanish Jesuit priest who went to Korea to do missionary work. He arrived in Busan on 27 December 1593. He accompanied the forces commanded by Konishi Yukinaga, himself a Kirishitan daimyō, and proselytized among the Japanese soldiers during the first Japanese invasion of Korea under Toyotomi Hideyoshi. There is little evidence that he interacted directly with the Korean population, but it is believed that he did proselytize among Koreans who were being held captive by the Japanese.

References

Year of birth missing
Year of death missing
Roman Catholic missionaries in Korea
Roman Catholic missionaries in Japan
Spanish Roman Catholic missionaries
Spanish Roman Catholic priests
16th-century Spanish people
Spanish expatriates in Korea